Christophe Brown (born July 26, 1974 in Albuquerque, New Mexico), also known as Christopher Brown, is a former American-Swiss professional ice hockey player who played in the European Elite Switzerland National League A (NLA)  for  HC Fribourg-Gottéron, EV Zug, and Lausanne HC.

Career statistics

References

External links
 

1974 births
EHC Visp players
EV Zug players
HC Fribourg-Gottéron players
HC Sierre players
Lausanne HC players
Living people
Swiss ice hockey right wingers
Ice hockey people from New Mexico